Fate Leonard Echols (June 29, 1939 – October 10, 2002) was an American football offensive tackle who played two seasons with the St. Louis Cardinals of the National Football League. He was drafted by the St. Louis Cardinals in the first round of the 1962 NFL Draft. Echols was also drafted by the New York Titans in the third round of the 1962 AFL Draft. He played college football at Northwestern University and attended Washington High School in South Bend, Indiana.

References

External links
Just Sports Stats
Fanbase profile

1939 births
2002 deaths
Players of American football from Alabama
American football offensive tackles
American football defensive tackles
African-American players of American football
Northwestern Wildcats football players
St. Louis Cardinals (football) players
People from Union Springs, Alabama
20th-century African-American sportspeople
21st-century African-American people